Robert E. Huddleston (born February 22, 1955) is an American politician. He is a former member of the Mississippi House of Representatives from the 30th District, being first elected in 1995. He is a member of the Democratic party. Huddleston resigned in 2018 and was succeeded by Tracey Rosebud, who won the May 29, 2018 special election runoff for House District 30.

References

1955 births
Living people
Members of the Mississippi House of Representatives
African-American state legislators in Mississippi
21st-century American politicians
People from Sumner, Mississippi
21st-century African-American politicians
20th-century African-American people